Velda City is a city in St. Louis County, Missouri, United States. The population was 1,420 at the 2010 census.

Geography
Velda City is located at  (38.694051, -90.294163).

Velda City has the highest population density of any municipality in Missouri.

Demographics

2010 census
As of the census of 2010, there were 1,420 people, 578 households, and 363 families living in the city. The racial makeup of the city was 3.0% White, 95.4% African American, 0.1% Native American, 0.1% Asian, 0.4% from other races, and 1.1% from two or more races. Hispanic or Latino of any race were 0.5% of the population.

There were 578 households, of which 34.6% had children under the age of 18 living with them, 18.7% were married couples living together, 37.2% had a female householder with no husband present, 6.9% had a male householder with no wife present, and 37.2% were non-families. 32.5% of all households were made up of individuals, and 11.4% had someone living alone who was 65 years of age or older. The average household size was 2.46 and the average family size was 3.10.

The median age in the city was 37 years. 25.7% of residents were under the age of 18; 9.8% were between the ages of 18 and 24; 23.4% were from 25 to 44; 26.6% were from 45 to 64; and 14.6% were 65 years of age or older. The gender makeup of the city was 43.6% male and 56.4% female.

2000 census
As of the census of 2000, there were 1,616 people, 610 households, and 428 families living in the city. The racial makeup of the city was 96.04% African American, 3.09% White, and 0.87% from two or more races. Hispanic or Latino of any race were 0.87% of the population.

There were 610 households, out of which 28.4% had children under the age of 18 living with them, 29.5% were married couples living together, 35.9% had a female householder with no husband present, and 29.7% were non-families. 27.5% of all households were made up of individuals, and 9.0% had someone living alone who was 65 years of age or older. The average household size was 2.65 and the average family size was 3.20.

In the city, the population was spread out, with 27.0% under the age of 18, 9.4% from 18 to 24, 26.5% from 25 to 44, 24.6% from 45 to 64, and 12.5% who were 65 years of age or older. The median age was 36 years. For every 100 females, there were 76.8 males. For every 100 females age 18 and over, there were 68.7 males.

The median income for a household in the city was $30,000, and the median income for a family was $31,652. Males had a median income of $27,768 versus $26,083 for females. The per capita income for the city was $15,009. About 15.9% of families and 17.5% of the population were below the poverty line, including 19.8% of those under age 18 and 23.3% of those age 65 or over.

References

Cities in St. Louis County, Missouri
Cities in Missouri